Arkansas's 4th congressional district is a congressional district located in the southwestern portion of the U.S. state of Arkansas. Notable towns in the district include Camden, Hope, Hot Springs, Magnolia, Pine Bluff, and Texarkana.

The district is currently represented by Republican Bruce Westerman.

Historically, the district has supported conservative Democrats such as Mike Ross and David Pryor, and was reckoned as a classic Yellow Dog Democrat district. However, the growing Republican trend in the state has overtaken the district since the start of the 21st century with the district supporting George W. Bush with 51% in 2004 and support grew as John McCain won the district in 2008 with 58% of the vote.

Recent US presidential election results

List of members representing the district

Recent US House election results

2002

2004

2006

2008

2010

2012

2014

2016

2018

2020

2022

Notes
Arkansas will hold their Primary Elections on May 24, 2022 – a process which the State of Arkansas calls a Preferential Primary Election. If no candidate in a contested Primary Election receives 50% of the vote or more of the vote, than a Runoff Primary Election will be held on June 21, 2022 – a process which the State of Arkansas calls a General Primary Election.

There is currently one declared candidate for Arkansas’ 4th Congressional District for the 2022 Election Cycle.

The incumbent office holder is denoted by an *. Any rumored candidates are denoted by an +.

Arkansas will hold their General Election on November 8, 2022. If no candidate in a contested General Election race receives 50% or more of the vote, than a General Runoff Election will be held on December 8, 2022.

References
Specific

General
 
 
 Congressional Biographical Directory of the United States 1774–present

04